Clarence Sinclair "Hec" Edmundson (August 3, 1886 – August 6, 1964) was an American basketball and track coach.

A native of Moscow, Idaho, and a 1910 graduate of the University of Idaho, Edmundson coached at his alma mater (1916–18) and the University of Washington (1920–47), compiling a 508–204 overall record in 29 seasons.

Edmundson also coached the track teams and served on the NCAA Basketball Committee from 1941 to 1946. The University of Washington hosted the national basketball finals in 1949 and 1952 in the arena that bears his name.

Nickname 
Edmundson gained his nickname from his mother: as a child he often muttered, "Oh, heck."

Collegiate and Olympic career 

One of the first great athletes at the fledgling University of Idaho in Moscow, Edmundson competed in track for his hometown university, and launched the team onto the national stage when he and two other athletes traveled to the Lewis and Clark Exposition Games against the top schools in the Northwest. While still in high school at the UI prep school, he lowered the Northwest record for the half-mile in June 1905.

Newspapers wrote that Edmundson "impressed with his graceful form and unfaltering determination." He is responsible for organizing the Idaho cross country team in 1908, which set the foundation for a team that would win nine Pacific Coast Conference titles. In 1908, Edmundson traveled to Stanford for the western U.S. Olympic trials, where he won the 800 meters and finished second in the 400 meters, but did not make the Olympic team. He later held the title of top half-miler in the country through 1912. Edmundson became the first Idahoan to compete in the Olympic Games in Stockholm in 1912. He finished seventh in the 800 meters and sixth in the 400 meters.

Edmundson attended the UI prep school and was a charter member of the new chapter of Kappa Sigma fraternity as an undergraduate. He earned a bachelor's degree in agriculture from Idaho in 1910, and then taught and coached at the high school level, one year each at Coeur d'Alene and Broadway High School in Seattle. He returned to Moscow to coach the UI track team in 1913.

Coaching career 
It was these basketball teams which were the first UI teams referred to as the  the nickname was eventually applied to all of the university's athletic teams by the early 1920s.

After a track season at Texas A&M, he headed to Seattle to coach the Washington Huskies, where he is credited with the creation of the fast-break offense style, which he attributed to his track background. He coached basketball through March 1947, and continued as track coach for another seven years.

Hec Edmundson Pavilion 

The UW Pavilion, a multi-purpose field house opened  in December 1927, was renamed "Hec Edmundson Pavilion" in his honor in January 1948. In March 1999, "Hec Ed" underwent a major interior renovation for 19 months and re-opened in November

Grave 
Edmundson died of a stroke in August 1964 at the age of 78, and was interred in Calvary Cemetery in northeast Seattle, about a mile (1½ km) north-northeast of the Hec Edmundson Pavilion. He is buried next to his wife Mary Zona Schultz  son James  and infant child (1921). Edmundson was posthumously inducted into the Big W Club, the UW athletics hall of fame, in the first class of 1979.

Edmundson's parents were Thomas Sinclair Edmundson (1854–1898) and Emma Jeannette Rowley  both buried in Moscow. His younger brother was Wilbur Clifford Edmundson, who taught horticulture at the UI and later worked for the Department of Agriculture in Washington, D.C.

Head coaching record

References

External links
 
 

1886 births
1964 deaths
American men's basketball players
American male middle-distance runners
American male sprinters
College men's basketball head coaches in the United States
Idaho Vandals men's track and field athletes
Idaho Vandals men's basketball coaches
Idaho Vandals men's basketball players
Idaho Vandals track and field coaches
People from Moscow, Idaho
Track and field athletes from Idaho
Texas A&M Aggies track and field coaches
Washington Huskies men's basketball coaches
Washington Huskies track and field coaches
Whitman Blues track and field coaches
Athletes (track and field) at the 1912 Summer Olympics
Olympic track and field athletes of the United States
Basketball coaches from Idaho
Basketball players from Idaho